Sport Club Gararu, commonly known as Gararu, is a Brazilian football club based in Gararu, Sergipe state.

History
The club was founded on January 1, 1989. Gararu won the Campeonato Sergipano Série A2 in 1997.

Achievements

 Campeonato Sergipano Série A2:
 Winners (1): 1997

Stadium
Sport Club Gararu play their home games at Estádio João Alves Filho. The stadium has a maximum capacity of 2,000 people.

References

Association football clubs established in 1989
Football clubs in Sergipe
1989 establishments in Brazil